Patrik Bacsa (born 3 June 1992) is a Hungarian football player who plays for Kazincbarcika.

Club career
Bacsa moved to Újpest in January 2020.

On 22 July 2021, Bacsa signed a two-year contract with Győri ETO.

On 2 February 2023, he moved to Kazincbarcika.

Club statistics

Updated to games played as of 27 June 2020.

Honours
Diósgyőr
Hungarian League Cup (1): 2013–14

References

External links
DVTK website

1992 births
Living people
Sportspeople from Miskolc
Hungarian footballers
Hungary youth international footballers
Hungary under-21 international footballers
Association football forwards
Diósgyőri VTK players
Kisvárda FC players
Újpest FC players
Győri ETO FC players
Kazincbarcikai SC footballers
Nemzeti Bajnokság I players
Nemzeti Bajnokság II players